The 2021 Tennis Napoli Cup was a professional tennis tournament played on clay courts. It was the 20th edition of the tournament which was part of the 2021 ATP Challenger Tour. It took place in Naples, Italy between 4 and 10 October 2021.

Singles main-draw entrants

Seeds

 1 Rankings as of 27 September 2021.

Other entrants
The following players received wildcards into the singles main draw:
  Matteo Arnaldi
  Jacopo Berrettini
  Luca Nardi

The following player received entry into the singles main draw using a protected ranking:
  Filippo Baldi

The following player received entry into the singles main draw as an alternate:
  Miljan Zekić

The following players received entry from the qualifying draw:
  Bogdan Ionuț Apostol
  Raúl Brancaccio
  Marco Miceli
  Julian Ocleppo

The following players received entry as lucky losers:
  Alexandru Jecan
  Petros Tsitsipas

Champions

Singles

  Tallon Griekspoor def.  Andrea Pellegrino 6–3, 6–2.

Doubles

  Dustin Brown /  Andrea Vavassori def.  Mirza Bašić /  Nino Serdarušić 7–5, 7–6(7–5).

References

2021 ATP Challenger Tour
Tennis Napoli Cup
2021 in Italian tennis
October 2021 sports events in Italy